Zamoran, (Balochi) زامُران also spelled Zamuran, is an area situated northwest of the Kech District of  Balochistan Province in Pakistan and southeast of the Sistan and Baluchistan Province in Iran. It was named after a leafy tree, the zamor, found in the area. Another possible origin of the name is from a combination of the two words zaa meaning abuse and miran meaning shall be killed or sacrificed. The meaning taken from that is that the people living in Zamoran would prefer to be killed rather than abused. The population and way of living is purely rural and tribal.

People are ethnically Baloch and speak Balochi. It has beautiful small valleys and springs and high mountains. The means of transportation was mainly donkeys and camels but in these days there are roads and people travel by cars and motorcycles.

In the 19th century the rulers nawabs applied taxes on animals and trees in Makran's different areas including Buleda but when it came to the people of Zamuran, they rejected payment of taxes which was unlawful. In 1901, Mir Mohammad Omer was ruling the Makran. He decided to go to Zamuran and collect taxes with force but as he came to Zamuran, the people stood against him and after a fierce battle, he lost and ran away. 

The main tribes of Zamuran are Shambezai, Durrazai, Yallanzai, Palizai, Askani, Mohammed zai, Zahrozai, Mazrahi, Sanjarani, Taj Mohammed zai, Lehbarzai Rind and Kuhda. Zamuran is one of the biggest regions in the Kech dist of makuran (makran) division with 5 union councils (Badai, Nag, Marguti, Siyah Gisi & Darabuli) sharing boundaries with Parom in Panjgur District, Buleda, Tump, Mand, and some areas of Western Balochistan (Sistan Baluchistan) like Hong, Sarbaz, Hedouch, and Bam Pusht.

References

Kech District